Blenheim is a civil parish in West Oxfordshire, England, about  north of Oxford. At its edge is Blenheim Palace, which is the birthplace of Sir Winston Churchill and the ancestral home of the Dukes of Marlborough.

References

Civil parishes in Oxfordshire
West Oxfordshire District